This is a list of the 81 members of the European Parliament for France in the 1979 to 1984 session.

List
 Gisèle Bochenek-Forray
 Édith Cresson
 Jacques Delors 
 Claude Estier
 Maurice Faure
 Yvette Fuillet
 Françoise Gaspard
 Gérard Jaquet
 Charles Josselin
 Charles-Emile Loo
 Gilles Martinet
 Pierre Mauroy 
 Jacques Moreau
 Didier Motchane
 Jean Oehler 
 Daniel Percheron
 Edgard Pisani
 Yvette Roudy 
 Georges Sarre 
 Roger-Gérard Schwartzenberg 
 Georges Sutra de Germa
 Marie-Claude Vayssade
 Gustave Ansart
 Louis Baillot
 Robert Chambeiron
 Félix Damette
 Danielle De Marc
 Jacques Denis
 Guy Fernandez
 Georges Frischmann
 Maxime Gremetz
 Jacqueline Hoffmann
 Emmanuel Maffre-Baugé
 Georges Marchais
 Maurice Martin
 Sylvie Mayer
 René-Emile Piquet
 Henriette Poirier
 Pierre-Benjamin Pranchère
 Paul Vergès
 Francis Wurtz
 Hubert Jean Buchou
 Jacques Chirac 
 Nicole Chouraqui 
 Michel Debré
 Gustave Deleau
 Marie-Madeleine Dienesch
 Maurice Druon
 Alain Gillot
 Claude Labbé 
 Christian de la Malène
 Pierre Messmer 
 Christian Poncelet 
 Eugène Remilly
 Louise Weiss 
 Henri Caillavet
 Corentin Calvez
 Francis Combe
 Charles Delatte
 Robert Delorozoy
 Georges Donnez
 Edgar Faure
 Yves Galland
 Simone Martin
 Jean-François Pintat
 Michel Poniatowski
 Marie-Jane Pruvot
 André Rossi
 Victor Sablé
 Christiane Scrivener
 Simone Veil
 Pierre Baudis
 Francisque Collomb
 Michel Debatisse
 André Diligent
 Jean Lecanuet
 Olivier d'Ormesson
 Louise Moreau
 Pierre Pflimlin
 Jean Seitlinger
 Maurice-René Simonnet

References 

1979
List
France